Warren Ransom Davis (May 8, 1793 – January 29, 1835) was an American attorney and Representative from South Carolina's 6th congressional district from 1827-35.

Davis was born in Columbia, South Carolina, pursued preparatory studies and graduated from South Carolina College (now the University of South Carolina Columbia) in 1810, where he was a member of the Euphradian Society.  He studied law and was admitted to the bar in 1814, practicing in Pendleton.  He later served as state solicitor of the western circuit from 1818 to 1824.

Davis was elected as a Jacksonian to the 20th United States Congress and 21st Congresses, reelected as a Nullifier to the 
22nd through 24th Congresses and served from March 4, 1827, until his death in Washington, D.C., on January 29, 1835, before the opening of the 24th Congress.  During the 22nd Congress he was chairman of the Committee on the Judiciary.

On the day after his death, his funeral was disrupted by an assassination attempt on President Andrew Jackson by a deranged house painter, Richard Lawrence.  Davis is interred in the Congressional Cemetery.

See also
List of United States Congress members who died in office (1790–1899)

References 

Political Graveyard

1793 births
1835 deaths
South Carolina lawyers
Burials at the Congressional Cemetery
Nullifier Party members of the United States House of Representatives
Nullifier Party politicians
Politicians from Columbia, South Carolina
University of South Carolina alumni
Jacksonian members of the United States House of Representatives from South Carolina
19th-century American politicians
Lawyers from Columbia, South Carolina